Louise Arner Boyd (September 16, 1887 – September 14, 1972) was an American explorer of Greenland and the Arctic, who wrote extensively of her scientific expeditions, and became the first woman to fly over the North Pole in 1955, after privately chartering a DC-4 and crew that included aviation pioneers Thor Solberg and Paul Mlinar.

Biography
Born in San Rafael, California to John Franklin Boyd (part-owner of the Bodie, California gold mine) and Louise Cook Arner, Louise grew up in Marin County and the hills of Oakland playing and competing with her two older brothers, Seth and John.  The Boyds were leading citizens of the era and their children's early years, though privileged and relatively carefree, included a well-rounded education that was punctuated every summer by an extended stay on their ranch in the Oakland Hills. It was here where Louise and her brothers rode horses, explored Mount Diablo, fished, hunted, camped, and generally led a rugged and adventurous life.  When Louise was a teenager, both of her brothers died from heart disease within a few months of each other, brought on by childhood bouts of rheumatic fever. Her parents were devastated and began to lean heavily on Louise for care and comfort. It was at this time that the Boyds bequeathed to the City of San Rafael their former gatehouse and some of the family property as a memorial to their two sons which is known today as Boyd park. The Victorian-style building is presently the home of the Marin History Museum. After her brother's deaths, Louise traveled extensively with her parents making numerous trips to Europe. It was at this time that she developed a keen interest in photography.  In the spring of 1919, Louise took a train to Buffalo, N.Y., purchased a touring car, and accompanied by her chauffeur, drove across the United States at a time when there was no highway system and roads were often gravel and dirt. This would be the first of many cross-country trips that Louise would take and detail in her many journals. Upon her parents death in 1919 and 1920, Louise inherited the family fortune after caring for her parents in the last few years of their lives.

With her inheritance, Louise Boyd could control her own destiny and indulge her intrepid spirit developed during her active California childhood. She began to travel in the early 1920s, and on a trip to Norway in 1924 she cruised out to sea and saw the Polar Ice Pack for the first time. This experience proved instrumental in her life and she immediately began planning her own Arctic adventure. In 1925, she was presented to the King and Queen of England, an honor bestowed on few American women.  In 1926, she chartered the supply ship Hobby which had been used by famous arctic explorer Roald Amundsen, for a hunting and filming trip to the Arctic. She was accompanied by her friends, the Count & Countess Ribadavia. She gained international notoriety for her exploits (and hunting of polar bears) and was dubbed by newspapers around the world, as the, “Arctic Diana” and “The Girl Who Tamed the Arctic”. The Count of Ribadavia published a book with photographs by Louise in 1927 titled, Chasses Et Aventures Dans Les Regions Polaires.

In 1928, Boyd was planning a second pleasure trip aboard the Hobby when it was learned that the famous Norwegian explorer Roald Amundsen had failed to return in an attempt to find and rescue the Italian explorer Umberto Nobile whose balloon expedition to the arctic had recently gone missing.  Louise offered her services and the 'Hobby' to the Norwegian government to search for Amundsen, saying, “How could I go on a pleasure trip when those 22 lives were at stake?” Although she traveled about 10,000 miles (16,100 km) across the Arctic Ocean she found no trace of him.  Nevertheless, the Norwegian government awarded her the Chevalier Cross of the Order of Saint Olav. "She was the first American woman to receive the order and the third woman in the world to be so honored."

Boyd is primarily known for leading a series of scientific expeditions to the east and north coast of Greenland in the 1930s. Louise photographed, surveyed and collected hundreds of botanical specimens, under the tutelage of her good friend, Alice Eastwood of the California Academy of Sciences. The American Geographical Society published her findings and photographs from the 1933 and 1935 expeditions in a book titled The Fiord Region of East Greenland.  An area near the Gerard de Geer Glacier was later named Louise Boyd Land. For her leadership and scientific work, Ms. Boyd was awarded the prestigious Cullum Medal by the American Geographical Society (AGS) a few years later in 1938.

In August 1934, after being elected as a delegate to the International Geographical Congress in Warsaw, Poland, Louise set out on a 3-month journey across the Polish countryside photographing and recording the customs, dress, economy and culture of the many ethnic Poles, Ukrainians, Byelorussians and Lithuanians. The journey, by car, rail, boat and on foot took her first from Lviv to Kovel (these towns are in Ukraine today), and then to Kobrin – Pinsk – Kletsk – Nesvizh – Slonim (these towns are in Belarus today). She finished the journey in Vilno. Her travel narrative was supplemented with over 500 photographs and published by the American Geographical Society in 1937 as Polish Countrysides.

With the outbreak of World War II, the knowledge she had gained in the course of her six previous expeditions to Greenland and the Arctic was considered strategically significant to the war effort. The United States government requested that she not publish the book she was writing about her 1937 and 1938 expeditions and asked her to lead a geophysical expedition along the west coast of Greenland and down the coast of Baffin Island and Labradorfor the Department of Commerce National Bureau of Standards. She was appointed as the Bureau's consulting expert on a dollar a year basis. At her own expense, she chartered and outfitted the schooner Effie M. Morrissey. This schooner, owned and commanded by captain Robert Bartlett, had been successfully running yearly scientific expeditions to the Arctic since 1926. The principal purpose of the 1941 Bureau of Standards expedition was to obtain data on radio-wave transmission in the Arctic regions traversed. The ionosphere, geomagnetism and aurorae were studied. The Effie M. Morrissey sailed from Washington DC on June 11, 1941, with Louise Boyd leading a scientific party of four men (including a physician) and a crew of eleven under the command of Capt. Bartlett. The expedition returned to Washington DC on November 3, 1941 with valuable data.

During the remainder of the war, Boyd worked on secret assignments for the U.S. Department of the Army and in 1949 was awarded a Department of Army Certificate of Appreciation.

Her earlier book that had been held from publication, The Coast of Northeast Greenland, was published after the war, in 1948.

Later in life Louise Boyd was an active and well-known Marin figure and hostess while serving as a member of the Executive Committee of the San Francisco Symphony. She also accumulated many academic honors receiving an honorary law degree from the University of California, Berkeley and from Mills College. In 1960 Louise was the first woman to be elected to the board of the American Geographical Society. She was also made an honorary member of the California Academy of Science. Near the end of her life, Louise fell on hard financial times having spent much of her fortune outfitting and chartering her many explorations. Eventually, she had to sell the family home, Maple Lawn in San Rafael, and took up permanent residence in San Francisco.  Louise died in San Francisco on September 14, 1972, two days shy of her 85th birthday.

Publications

See also
 List of female explorers and travelers

References

Further reading
 Giffuni, Cathy. "A Bibliography of Louise Arner Boyd,"  Bulletin: Geography and Map Division, Special Libraries Association, No. 146, December 1986.
 Fletcher, Scott. Librarian, San Domenico School, San Anselmo, CA.
 Kafarowski, Joanna. The Polar Adventures of a Rich American Dame: A Life of Louise Arner Boyd. Dundurn Press, 2017.
 
 

Kafarowski, J. (2018). La vida de Louise Arner Boyd (Spanish edition). Madrid: Ediciones Casiopea.
Kafarowski, J. (2019). "Remembering the 20th Century's Leading Female Arctic Explorer." July/August, 2019. Saturday Evening Post.
Kafarowski, J. (2021). "Searching for Amundsen: Louise Arner Boyd aboard the Hobby." Winter issue. No. 177: 12-17.  Sea History.
Kafarowski, J. (2022). "Greenland Beckons: Explorer Louise Arner Boyd aboard the Veslekari." Winter issue. No. 181: 24-29. Sea History.

External links
 Moss, Jocelyn. "The Call of the Arctic: Travels of Louise Boyd".  Marin County Historical Society Magazine, vol. XIV, no. 2, 1987.
 Encyclopedia of World Biography
 A guide to the Louise A. Boyd arctic expedition maps, 1926–1955

1887 births
1972 deaths
Explorers of the Arctic
American explorers
Female polar explorers
Writers from San Francisco
Recipients of the Cullum Geographical Medal
American Polar Society honorary members
People from San Rafael, California
Female travelers
American travel writers
American women travel writers
20th-century American women writers
20th-century American non-fiction writers
20th-century American photographers
Photographers from San Francisco
20th-century American women photographers